Lilo, stage name of Liselotte Johanna Lewin (2 March 1921 – 26 September 2022), was a German-born French actress and singer.

Biography
Lilo was born in Dortmund in 1921 as Liselotte Johanna Lewin. In 1953, she played the lead role in the musical Can-Can at the Shubert Theatre, where she notably sang the songs "C'est Magnifique" and "I Love Paris", written by Cole Porter.

Death
Lilo died in New York City on 26 September 2022 at the age of 101.

Filmography
 (1951)
 (1952)
 (1956)
 (1963)
La bonne année (1973)
And Now My Love (1974)

References

1921 births
2022 deaths
20th-century French actresses
20th-century French singers
French film actresses
French musical theatre actresses
People from Dortmund
Women centenarians